René Muñoz (February 19, 1938 – May 11, 2000) was a Cuban actor and screenwriter of telenovelas and the cinema of Mexico.

He is most remembered for his role in the Spanish film Fray Escoba.

Biography
He was born in Havana, Cuba but started his acting career in Spain with the film Fray Escoba of Ramón Torrado. He made two more films with him and then moved to Mexico to participate in Los hijos que yo soñé ("The sons I dreamed of") and the telenovela San Martín de Porres that made him famous in this country. He made his last film in the Mexico/United States production The Bees and focused on working on telenovelas. In 1987 he wrote his first scripts for telenovelas for Como duele callar and the first story written for a young audience Quinceañera. Quinceañera was the telenovela of the year, it featured singer Thalía in one of the main roles and catapulted the career of Adela Noriega in her first starring role. In 1992 he wrote the script for De frente al sol, a telenovela starred by Angélica Aragón in the role of an indigenous woman and its sequel Más allá del puente. In 1986 he adapted the script for Monte Calvario and in 1997 for its remake Te sigo amando. He took the role of Padre Murillo in both productions. He also was an actor, and performed in, La Usurpadora. His acting playing role as Mojarras.

He died of cancer in May 2000 in Mexico City, in full recording of the soap opera Abrázame muy fuerte.

Films

 The Bees (1978) as a delegate
 Cuna de valientes (1972)
 El pocho (1970) as a delegate
 Un mulato llamado Martín (1970) as Fray Martín de Porres
 Los hijos que yo soñé (1965)
 Bienvenido, padre Murray (1964)
 Cristo negro (1963)
 Fray Escoba (1961) as Fray Martín de Porres

Telenovelas

 Abrázame muy fuerte (2000-2001) as Regino
 Rosalinda (1999) as Abuelo Florentino Rosas
 La Usurpadora (1998) as Luis Felipe Benítez aka "El Mojarras"
 Te sigo amando (1996-1997) as Padre Murillo
 María la del Barrio (1995-1996) as El Veracruz
 Marimar (1994) as Padre Porres
 Más allá del puente (1993-1994) as Quijano
 De frente al sol (1992) as Quijano
 Carrusel de las Américas (1992) as Alvaro
 Mi pequeña Soledad (1990) as Gaetano
 Cuando llega el amor (1989-1990) as Chucho
 Quinceañera (1987-1988)  as Tino
 Rosa salvaje (1987-1988)  as Doctor
 Monte Calvario (1986) as Padre
 Pobre juventud (1986-1987) as Anselmo
 Vivir un poco (1985-1986) Telenovela
 El cielo es para todos (1979) as San Martín de Porres
 Corazón salvaje (1977-1978) as Esteban
 La venganza (1977) as Mohamed
 Los que ayudan a Dios (1973-1974) as Dr. César Grajales
 San Martín de Porres (1964-1965) as San Martín de Porres

Scripts

Adaptation
 Que te perdone Dios (2015)
 Abrázame muy fuerte (2000)
 Primer amor... a mil por hora (2000)
 María Isabel, si tu supieras (1997)
 Te sigo amando (1997)
 Mi querida Isabel (1996)
 Mi pequeña Soledad (1990)

Original story
 Primer amor, a mil por hora (2000)
 Más allá del puente (1994)
 De frente al sol (1992)
 Quinceañera (1987)
 Cómo duele callar (1987)

External links
 

Cuban male film actors
Cuban screenwriters
Cuban male writers
Male screenwriters
1938 births
2000 deaths
People from Havana
Cuban male television actors
Cuban emigrants to Mexico
20th-century Cuban male actors
20th-century screenwriters